Gramada Municipality is a small municipality (obshtina) in Vidin Province, Northwestern Bulgaria, located in the Danubian Plain about 8 km southwest of Danube river. It is named after its administrative centre - the town of Gramada.

The easternmost border of the area is linked by the main road E79 which connects the province centre of Vidin with the city of Montana and respectively with the western operating part of Hemus motorway.

Settlements 

Gramada Municipality includes the following 8 places (towns are shown in bold):

Demography 
The following table shows the change of the population during the last four decades.

See also
Provinces of Bulgaria
Municipalities of Bulgaria
List of cities and towns in Bulgaria

References

External links
 Info website 

Municipalities of Vidin Province